Broadstone Mill was a double cotton spinning mill on the eastern bank of the Stockport Branch Canal in Reddish, Stockport, Greater Manchester, in England. Construction of the twin mills commenced in 1903 and was completed in 1907. They closed in 1957, and the southern mill and engine houses were demolished in 1965. The northern block went into multiple usage. It is now part of the Houldsworth Village development. It is used as a centre for small businesses, and a shopping outlet.

Location 
The double mills were built next to Houldsworth's Reddish Mills, fronting on the Stockport Branch Canal. It is close to Reddish South railway station on the Stockport to Stalybridge Line

History
The Broadstone Spinning Co., Ltd., Reddish, was incorporated in 1903, with the intention of erecting a large double mill.  No. 1 mill covered 7,658 square yards, and No 2 mill 8,457 square yards. Each mill was six storeys high, 270 feet long by 143 feet. Work commenced on No. 1 mill at the end of 1906, and No 2 mill a year later. The mills contained 260,000 mule spindles, and cost £480,000 when fully equipped . They were entitled to draw water for the condensers directly from the canal at no cost. In 1919 the mills were sold to the Broadstone Mills Limited.

The decline of cotton spinning was accompanied by high farce. In November 1958 the company sold a number of spinning mules as scrap for just over £3,000. By agreement, the machines remained in the mill over the winter. A small number had been broken and removed by April 1959, when the government announced a compensation package for firms that agreed to scrap spinning capacity. As the title in the mules had passed to the scrapman, it was decided that the company was not entitled to compensation amounting to over £60,000, despite the fact that the machinery was still on its premises. Actions in the High Court and the Court of Appeal in 1965 were fruitless.

Architecture 
This was a large six-storey double mill with 260,000 spindles. It was built by Stott and Sons, and its features were described as Byzantine in style. Each mill was 12 bays wide and 9 bays deep, the rope race forming a thirteenth bay.

The floors were designed for the machines they accommodated. The tower contained the staircase, hoist and toilets.

Power 
Each mill was powered by a George Saxon & Co 1500 hp triple expansion inverted vertical steam engines, with Corliss valves. They were powered by steam at 200 psi and ran at 75 rpm. The cylinders has 22in, 35in and 54in bores, and 4 ft stroke.

Equipment 
All machinery both mills were supplied by John Hetherington & Co.Ltd. The first mill had mules with 125,000 spindles and the second mill held 140,000 spindles, giving a total of 265,000 for the two mills.

Usage
Originally they spun best Egyptian cottons, in what was technically termed "combed" and "super carded yarns." The range of counts was 160's to 30's for the home and export trade, and they employed 700 people.

Owners
Broadstone Spinning Company Ltd.
Broadstone Mills Ltd.
Multi usage
Part of the Houldsworth Village- shopping outlet, small business units

Current Usage
The mill is currently part of the Houldsworth Village Development, and since closing in 1957 has been redeveloped and transformed into a large shopping outlet and business centre, containing offices, conferencing centres, and a creative gallery. Currently, redevelopments are underway of the first floor, in order to expand the retail outlet onto two levels, which is planned to be completed by early 2013.

Notable events/media
When completed, Broadstone Mill was the largest cotton spinning mill in the world. The previous largest, Houldsworth Mill, stands 200 metres north.

See also 

List of mills in Stockport
Listed buildings in Stockport
Textile manufacturing
Cotton Mill
Houldsworth Mill, Reddish

References
Notes

Bibliography

External links

 www.cottontown.org
 www.spinningtheweb.org.uk
 Houldsworth Village
 www.broadstonemill.com

Textile mills in the Metropolitan Borough of Stockport
Cotton mills
Former textile mills in the United Kingdom
Buildings and structures in the Metropolitan Borough of Stockport
Buildings and structures completed in 1907
1907 establishments in England